Courtney Brosnan (born 10 November 1995) is a professional footballer who plays as a goalkeeper for English Women's Super League club Everton. Born in the United States, she has over 11 caps for the Republic of Ireland women's national team.

Club career 
Raised in the Short Hills section of Millburn, New Jersey, Brosnan attended Millburn High School before moving on to play for the Syracuse Orange women's soccer team.

West Ham United 
On 21 May 2021 Brosnan was released from her contract by West Ham.

International career 
Of Irish descent, she is available to represent the Republic of Ireland, ultimately chose to represent Ireland.

On 11 October 2022, Brosnan saved a penalty in the Rep of Ireland's World Cup Qualifier play-off against Scotland, which her team eventually won 1–0 and qualified for the 2023 FIFA Women's World Cup.

References

External links

Courtney Brosnan at Footofeminin.fr 

1995 births
Living people
Millburn High School alumni
People from Millburn, New Jersey
Soccer players from New Jersey
Sportspeople from Essex County, New Jersey
Syracuse Orange women's soccer players
West Ham United F.C. Women players
American women's soccer players
Irish expatriate sportspeople in England
Irish expatriate sportspeople in France
Expatriate women's footballers in France
Expatriate women's footballers in England
Women's association football goalkeepers
Republic of Ireland women's international footballers
Republic of Ireland women's youth international footballers
American people of Irish descent